Nina Leopold Bradley (born Nina Leopold) (August 4, 1917 – May 25, 2011) was an American conservationist, researcher and writer.

Biography
Her father was the ecologist Aldo Leopold.

She graduated with a bachelor's degree in geography from the University of Wisconsin–Madison. During WW II she worked as an assistant to Thomas Park on the Tribolium project at the University of Chicago. She was the senior author of the 1999 article Phenological changes reflect climate change in Wisconsin, which has over 700 citations.

She married the zoologist William H. Elder in 1941. Working together, they studied wildlife in Illinois and Missouri. They had two daughters and did field work together in Hawaii and Africa. Their marriage ended in divorce. In 1971 she married the geologist Charles Bradley.

Death and legacy
She died May 25, 2011, aged 93.

In 2013, Bradley was posthumously inducted into the Wisconsin Conservation Hall of Fame.

References

External links
The Aldo Leopold Foundation 
Aldo Leopold's Children in the Encyclopedia of Earth

1917 births
2011 deaths
American conservationists
People from Baraboo, Wisconsin
University of Wisconsin–Madison College of Letters and Science alumni
Writers from Boston
Writers from Wisconsin
Writers from Albuquerque, New Mexico
20th-century American writers
Women conservationists
20th-century American women writers
21st-century American women